The Red Gulch/Alkali National Back Country Byway is a  National Scenic Byway to the west of the Big Horn Mountains in Wyoming in the United States. It connects Wyoming Highway 31 (WYO 31) in Hyattville with U.S. Route 14 (US 14) near Shell.

Route description
The byway begins at an intersection with Wyoming Highway 31 (WYO 31) in Hyattville to U.S. Route 14 (US 14) south-southwest of Shell. The byway can be driven from May through to October; though light rain can make traveling conditions unsafe. Also, in dry conditions, there can be considerable dust.

Attractions include the Red Gulch Dinosaur Tracksite and the Medicine Lodge State Archeological Site.

Major intersections

References

National Scenic Byways
Bureau of Land Management Back Country Byways
Transportation in Big Horn County, Wyoming
Bureau of Land Management areas in Wyoming